Alexander "Sandro" Mamukelashvili (born May 23, 1999) is a Georgian-American professional basketball player for the San Antonio Spurs of the National Basketball Association (NBA). He played college basketball for the Seton Hall Pirates.

Mamukelashvili attended basketball powerhouse Montverde Academy after a stint on youth teams in Italy. As a junior at Seton Hall, Mamukelashvili missed several weeks with a wrist injury but averaged 11.9 points per game. He was named Big East Co-Player of the Year as a senior.

Early life and high school career
Mamukelashvili was born in New York City and grew up in Tbilisi, Georgia after moving to the country when he was a baby. He is fluent in English, Georgian, Russian, and Italian. His grandmother, Ira Gabashvili, was a member of the Soviet Women's National Basketball team. Mamukelashvili's older brother David introduced him to basketball at a young age, and Sandro grew up idolizing the Georgian player Zaza Pachulia. He was in Chicago visiting his aunt, noted pianist Eteri Andjaparidze, when the Russo-Georgian War broke out in August 2008. David currently teaches English at Newark Academy in Livingston, New Jersey. 

When he was 14 years old, Mamukelashvili moved to Biella, Italy to attend high school. He competed on the U17, U18, and U19 teams, and he helped the teams to finish third place in the national finals. Mamukelashvili said that moving to Italy was difficult but his club and head coach Federico Danna made everything possible for him. In 2016, he moved to the United States to attend basketball powerhouse Montverde Academy, where he played alongside New York Knicks player RJ Barrett. While at Montverde, Pachulia became a mentor to Mamukelashvili and introduced him to several players such as Stephen Curry. Mamukelashvili scored 11 points in a 72–45 win over Greensboro Day School to help Montverde reach the finals of the "DICK’S Sporting Goods High School Nationals". 

On April 20, 2017, Mamukelashvili committed to playing college basketball for Seton Hall over offers from USC, South Carolina, and Vanderbilt. He chose the Pirates because his high school coach Kevin Boyle had a good relationship with Seton Hall coach Kevin Willard and his brother David lived nearby.

College career
As a freshman, Mamukelashvili averaged 2.6 points, 1.9 rebounds and 0.5 blocks per game and helped the Pirates reach the second round of the NCAA Tournament. His best game as a freshman came against Xavier on February 14, 2018, when he scored 17 points and grabbed seven rebounds. As a sophomore, he averaged 8.9 points and 7.8 rebounds per game. On December 19, Mamukelashvili scored a season-high 23 points on 8-of-11 shooting and had eight rebounds in a 90–76 win over Sacred Heart. Following his sophomore season, Mamukelashvili worked with Pachulia at his Academy in Tbilisi to expand his game, adding a jump stop and improving his three-point shooting.

On November 29, 2019, Mamukelashvili scored 18 points on 7-of-10 shooting and had six rebounds in an 84–76 win over Iowa State in the Bahamas. During the Battle 4 Atlantis tournament, Mamukelashvili averaged 14 points, 5.7 rebounds and 2 assists per game while making 61 percent of his shots from the field and 60 percent from behind the arc. He fractured his right wrist in a game against Iowa State on December 8 and missed several weeks. On January 29, 2020, he returned to the court, playing five minutes in a 64–57 win over DePaul. On February 19, with his father Zurab in attendance for the first time in two years, Mamukelashvili scored 15 points and had six rebounds, hitting the game-winning shot on an inbounds pass with 0.6 seconds remaining in a 74–72 win over Butler. He had a season-high 26 points on February 29, in an 88–79 win over Marquette. Mamukelashvili averaged 11.9 points and 6 rebounds per game as a junior. After the season, he declared for the 2020 NBA draft but did not hire an agent, signaling high potential to return to Seton Hall for his senior campaign. After receiving second round interest, Mamukelashvili announced on August 1 that he was withdrawing from the draft and returning for his senior season.

Coming into his senior season, Mamukelashvili was named to the Preseason First Team All-Big East, and he was expected to help replace the graduated Myles Powell. On December 11, 2020, he scored a career-high 32 points and had nine rebounds and three assists in a 77–68 victory against St. John's. On February 16, 2021, Mamukelashvili scored his 1,000th career point in a 60–52 win against DePaul and finished with 25 points, 11 rebounds and four assists. He averaged 17.5 points, 7.6 rebounds and 3.2 assists per game. At the close of the season, he was named the Big East co-Player of the Year and won the Haggerty Award as the best player in the New York metropolitan area. Mamukelashvili was also named Associated Press All-America honorable mention and was a finalist for the Karl Malone Award.

Professional career

Milwaukee Bucks (2021–2023)
Mamukelashvili was selected in the second round of the 2021 NBA draft with the 54th pick by the Indiana Pacers. He was then traded to the Milwaukee Bucks along with the draft rights of Georgios Kalaitzakis, the 60th pick, and two future second round picks in exchange for the draft rights of the 31st pick, Isaiah Todd. On August 4, 2021, the Bucks signed him to a two-way contract. Under the terms of the deal he would split time between the Bucks and their NBA G League affiliate, the Wisconsin Herd. On October 19, 2021, Mamukelashvili had his debut in the NBA, coming off from bench with an assist and a rebound in a 127–104 win over the Brooklyn Nets. On October 26, he was assigned to the Wisconsin Herd. On November 29, while playing with the Herd, Mamukelashvili posted 28 points, six rebounds, three assists, three blocks, and one steal in a win against the Windy City Bulls. He missed two games with an illness in December 2021.

Mamukelashvili joined the Bucks' 2022 NBA Summer League roster. On July 18, 2022, Mamukelashvili was named to the All-NBA Summer League First Team.

On March 1, 2023, Mamukelashvili was waived by the Bucks.

San Antonio Spurs (2023–present)
On March 3, 2023, the San Antonio Spurs claimed Mamukelashvili off of waivers and converted his deal to a standard NBA contract.

National team career
In July 2018, Mamukelashvili represented the Georgia national basketball team at the 2019 FIBA World Cup Qualifications and the Georgia U20 team at the FIBA U20 European Championship. During the European Championship, he averaged 8.7 points, 7.0 rebounds, and 1.7 assists per game.

Career statistics

NBA

|-
| style="text-align:left;"| 
| style="text-align:left;"| Milwaukee
| 41 || 3 || 9.9 || .496 || .423 || .818 || 2.0 || .5 || .2 || .2 || 3.8
|-
| style="text-align:left;"| 
| style="text-align:left;"| Milwaukee
| 24 || 0 || 9.0 || .328 || .219 || .667 || 2.3 || .7 || .2 || .2 || 2.4
|- class="sortbottom"
| style="text-align:center;" colspan="2"| Career
| 65 || 3 || 9.6 || .439 || .345 || .750 || 2.1 || .6 || .2 || .2 || 3.2

College

|-
| style="text-align:left;"| 2017–18
| style="text-align:left;"| Seton Hall
| 34 || 0 || 9.6 || .471 || .296 || .600 || 1.9 || .5 || .2 || .5 || 2.6
|-
| style="text-align:left;"| 2018–19
| style="text-align:left;"| Seton Hall
| 34 || 34 || 29.2 || .437 || .301 || .612 || 7.8 || 1.6 || .6 || 1.2 || 8.9
|-
| style="text-align:left;"| 2019–20
| style="text-align:left;"| Seton Hall
| 20 || 18 || 26.1 || .540 || .434 || .658 || 6.0 || 1.4 || .5 || .6 || 11.9
|-
| style="text-align:left;"| 2020–21
| style="text-align:left;"| Seton Hall
| 27 || 27 || 35.6 || .434 || .336 || .714 || 7.6 || 3.2 || 1.1 || .6 || 17.5
|- class="sortbottom"
| style="text-align:center;" colspan="2"| Career
| 115 || 79 || 24.4 || .459 || .339 || .663 || 5.7 || 1.6 || .6 || .7 || 9.6

References

External links
Seton Hall Pirates bio

1999 births
Living people
American men's basketball players
Basketball players from New York City
Basketball players from Tbilisi
Indiana Pacers draft picks
Men's basketball players from Georgia (country)
Milwaukee Bucks players
Montverde Academy alumni
National Basketball Association players from Georgia (country)
Power forwards (basketball)
San Antonio Spurs players
Seton Hall Pirates men's basketball players
Wisconsin Herd players